Ambelokipi is a station on Line 3 of the Athens Metro. Located at Alexandras Ave. and Panormou Ave., it is close not only to Kifissias Ave., but also to some important buildings of Athens, such as the Hellenic Police Headquarters, the Hellenic Supreme Court (Άρειος Πάγος) and the Apostolos Nikolaidis Stadium of Panathinaikos FC.

Station layout

References

Athens Metro stations
Railway stations opened in 2000
2000 establishments in Greece